Future Soundtrack for America is a benefit album for Music for America and MoveOn.org released in 2004 by Barsuk Records and McSweeney's and compiled by Spike Jonze and They Might Be Giants' founding member John Flansburgh.  Each CD bore the legend,  "100% of our profits from this CD will go to non-profit progressive organizations working to involve more Americans in our political process, to advocate for ordinary people and traditional American values, and to help keep the United States a country all of us can be proud of.  Thank you for your support."  Most songs were either rare or exclusive to this compilation album at the time it was released.  The CD was also included in The Future Dictionary of America, published simultaneously by McSweeney's.

At a They Might Be Giants concert at The Catalyst in Santa Cruz, California, the night before its release, Flansburgh had this to say about the album:
"We made some very, very cold, cold calls to our...fake, fake rock friends that we don't even know, to talk them into being on this thing, ladies and gentlemen."  He then added, "One more thing: If you're not registered to vote, what's up with that?"

Track listing

External links
Billboard article about Future Soundtrack for America
The Future Dictionary of America, McSweeney's page for the Future Dictionary / Future Soundtrack bundle

McSweeney's
2004 compilation albums
Charity albums
Barsuk Records compilation albums
Alternative rock compilation albums
Indie rock compilation albums
Folk compilation albums